is a 2004 Japanese action comedy film directed by Naoki Kudo, written by Naoki Kudo and Izō Hashimoto, and starring Shinya Hashimoto, Sonim, Shirō Sano, and Nicholas Pettas.  Hashimoto plays a professional wrestler whose wife involuntarily turns into a mermaid.

Plot 
Shishioh, a popular and successful professional wrestler, builds a large mansion for his wife Asami and their kids.  During the housewarming party, Ichijo, an angry competitor, causes a riot that destroys the house.  Asami is hospitalized, where she contracts a rare virus that slowly transforms her into a mermaid.  Desperate for money to finance his new house and find a cure for Asami, Shishioh agrees to a reality TV show in which he wrestles several competitors in a haunted house.  His opponents turn out to be homicidal killers and include a zombie among them.  Eventually, Shishioh learns that the television producer infected Asami with an experimental virus in order to get him to compete.

Cast 
 Shinya Hashimoto as Kouta Shishioh
 Sonim as Nami
 Shirô Sano as Yamaji
 Nicholas Pettas as Ichijoh
 Urara Awata as Asami

Release 
Oh!  My Zombie Mermaid premiered at the Yubari International Fantastic Film Festival on February 21, 2004.

Discotek Media purchased the North American distribution rights and released it in North America on July 28, 2009.

Reception 
Todd Brown of Twitch Film wrote that the first half takes itself too seriously, but the second half is "pure, ridiculous, campy joy to watch."  Bill Gibron of DVD Talk rated it 4.5/5 stars and called it "a true work of baffling genius."  In The Zombie Movie Encyclopedia, academic Peter Dendle wrote, "The film is fairly entertaining, and keeps providing narrative and conceptual twists every step along the way."

References

External links 
 

2004 films
2000s action comedy films
2000s Japanese-language films
Japanese action comedy films
Films about mermaids
Professional wrestling films
Zombie comedy films
Discotek Media
Japanese sports comedy films
2004 comedy horror films
2000s Japanese films